"It Feels So Right" is a song written by Ben Weisman and Fred Wise and originally recorded by Elvis Presley with the Jordanaires for his 1960 album Elvis Is  Back.

In 1965, a song titled "(Such an) Easy Question", used for that year's Presley movie Tickle Me, was coupled with "It Feels So Right" for a single release. "(Such an) Easy Question" peaked at number 11 on the Billboard Hot 100, and "It Feels So Right" peaked at number 55.

Composition 
The song was written by Ben Weisman and Fred Wise.

Recording 
Elvis Presley recorded the song on March 20, 1960, at RCA Studio B in Nashville. It was his second post-army recording session. The session featured Scotty Moore on guitar, Bob Moore on bass, Hank Garland on electric bass, D. J. Fontana and Buddy Harman on drums, Floyd Cramer on piano. Elvis Presley played guitar as well as sang. Additional vocals were provided by the Jordanaires.

Track listing

Charts

References

External links 
 
 (Such an) Easy Question / It Feels So Right on the Elvis Presley official website

1965 songs
1965 singles
Elvis Presley songs
Songs with music by Ben Weisman
Songs with lyrics by Fred Wise (songwriter)